is a river gorge and scenic spot located within the city of Shinshiro, Aichi Prefecture, Japan.  It has been protected as both a Place of Scenic Beauty and Natural Monument since 1934.

Overview
Chiiwa-kyō is a canyon located on the Chiiwa River, a tributary of the Urengawa River, with a total length is four kilometers within the Tenryū-Okumikawa Quasi-National Park. The cliff has many stalactites mainly composed of calcium carbonate from its overhangs, resembling breasts with milk. The gorge area is composed primarily of rhyolite tuff and the river bed in this area is made from a smooth monolith of limestone. Erosion on the riverbed has resulted in numerous potholes. The sides of the canyon are forested, and there are many caves in the area, the largest of which is called the "womb cave" and contains a statue of Kannon Bosatsu holding an infant. Near the top of the mountain, there is a natural arch called "Tsutenbashi" or "Gokurakumon".

See also
List of Places of Scenic Beauty of Japan (Aichi)

References

External links
 Shinshiro city official site  
  Aichi Now official site for Aichi Tourism 

Geography of Aichi Prefecture
Places of Scenic Beauty
Natural monuments of Japan
Canyons and gorges of Japan
Tourist attractions in Aichi Prefecture
Shinshiro, Aichi
IUCN Category III